The batán is a kitchen utensil used to process different kinds of foods in South American, Andean and Indian cuisine. It has a flat stone (the batán proper) and a grinding stone called an uña. The uña is held in both hands and rocked over the food in the batán. Depending on the process wished, the uña's weight is slightly held back, let loose over, or pressed on. The rocking movements also vary depending on the procedure. The grinding is done dry or with water or oil.

South America
The batán has been used since before the arrival of Spaniards in South America. In Andean households many different dishes are prepared in this manner, in rural and urban areas. The most important use it has is for preparing llajwa. For many Bolivians, Peruvians, Ecuadoreans and Colombians it is not the same when done in a blender.

It is also used to husk grains, wash quinoa from its alkaloid (saponin), grind grains, crush papalisa and even to prepare small quantities of flour.

India
It is also used in India in a large number of households. It is known there as "sil-batta" in Hindi with sil referring to flat stone and batta referring to a cylindrical grinding stone. In Nepal, it is known as silauto-lohoro. It is known as pata-varvanta in Marathi and used in the state of Maharashtra. It is known as ammi kallu in Tamil and Malayalam. It is known as "shil nora" in Bengali and is basically found to be used in almost every household in West  Bengal. In Odisha, it is called sila puaa where it is also worshipped as Bhu Devi or mother Earth during traditional Odia weddings and the Raja festival. It is traditionally used to grind spices and lentils in the states of Tamil Nadu and Kerala.  These grinding stones are primarily used to prepare chutney and spice mixes for cooking and occasional use including grinding soaked lentils in preparation for dosas, vadas, or papadum.

See also
 Household stone implements in Karnataka
 Metate
 Mortar and pestle
 Molcajete

References

Bolivian cuisine
Food preparation appliances
Lithics
Peruvian cuisine
Ecuadorian cuisine
Colombian cuisine
Indian cuisine